Edgehill or Edghill may refer to:

Places

England
 Edgehill, Warwickshire, a hamlet on the Edge Hill escarpment
 Battle of Edgehill or Edge Hill, a 1642 battle in the English Civil War
 Edgehill, a suburb of Scarborough, North Yorkshire
 Edgehill College, an independent school in Bideford, Devon

United States
 Edgehill, Missouri, an unincorporated community
 Edgehill, Virginia (disambiguation), several locations

Elsewhere
 Edgehill, a settlement near Walla Walla, New South Wales, Australia

Other uses
 Edgehill (decryption program), UK counterpart to the secret anti-encryption program run by the U.S. National Security Agency
 Ella Mary Edghill (1881–unknown), British translator
 Rosemary Edghill, American writer and editor

See also
 Edge Hill (disambiguation)